Chad Stephen Kessler (born June 24, 1975) is a former American football punter who played college football at Louisiana State University and attended Lake Mary High School in Lake Mary, Florida. He was a consensus All-American in 1997. Kessler was named first-team All-SEC in 1995 and 1997. He was also a member of the Tampa Bay Buccaneers of the National Football League. He now is an Ear, Nose and Throat doctor. His family includes; wife and three children.

Kessler's 50.28-yard single-season punting average from his 1997 LSU season was the SEC and NCAA Division I Football Bowl Subdivision record until it was broken by Texas A&M punter Braden Mann in 2018.

References

External links
College stats

Living people
1975 births
Players of American football from Orlando, Florida
American football punters
LSU Tigers football players
All-American college football players